The 11th Cannes Film Festival was held from 2 to 18 May 1958. The Palme d'Or went to the Letyat zhuravli by Mikhail Kalatozov.

Jury
The following people were appointed as the Jury of the 1958 competition:

Feature films
Marcel Achard (France) Jury President
Tomiko Asabuki (Japan)
Bernard Buffet (France)
Jean De Baroncelli (France) (critic)
Helmut Käutner (West Germany)
Dudley Leslie (UK)
Madeleine Robinson (France)
Ladislao Vajda (Hungary)
Charles Vidor (USA)
Sergei Yutkevich (Soviet Union)
Cesare Zavattini (Italy)
Short films
Norman McLaren (Canada)
Jean Mitry (France)
Krishna Riboud (India)
Edmond Séchan (France)
Jerzy Toeplitz (Poland)

Feature film competition
The following feature films competed for the Palme d'Or:

Brink of Life (Nära livet) by Ingmar Bergman
The Brothers Karamazov by Richard Brooks
La Caleta olvidada by Bruno Gebel
Ciulinii Bărăganului by Louis Daquin
The Cranes are Flying (Letyat zhuravli) by Mikhail Kalatozov
Desire Under the Elms by Delbert Mann
The Flute and the Arrow (En Djungelsaga) by Arne Sucksdorff
Girl and the River (L'eau vive) by François Villiers
Goha by Jacques Baratier
Iron Flower (Vasvirág) by János Herskó
Journey Beyond Three Seas (Pardesi) by Khwaja Ahmad Abbas and Vasili Pronin
The Long, Hot Summer by Martin Ritt
A Man of Straw (L'uomo di paglia) by Pietro Germi
A Matter of Dignity (To teleftaio psema) by Michael Cacoyannis
Mon Oncle by Jacques Tati
Nine Lives (Ni liv) by Arne Skouen
Orders to Kill by Anthony Asquith
Parash Pathar by Satyajit Ray
Rosaura at 10 O'Clock (Rosaura a las 10) by Mario Soffici
Sissi – Fateful Years of an Empress (Sissi – Schicksalsjahre einer Kaiserin) by Ernst Marischka
Snow Country (Yukiguni) by Shirō Toyoda
The Spessart Inn (Das Wirtshaus im Spessart) by Kurt Hoffmann
Suburban Romance (Zizkovská romance) by Zbyněk Brynych
Vengeance (La Venganza) by Juan Antonio Bardem
Visages de bronze by Bernard Taisant
Young Husbands (Giovani mariti) by Mauro Bolognini

Out of competition
The following film was selected to be screened out of competition:
Gigi by Vincente Minnelli

Short film competition
The following short films competed for the Short Film Palme d'Or:

 A.B.C. by John Fernhout
 Auf den Spuren des Lebens by Fritz Heydenreich
 Dubrovacki pasteli by Marijan Vajda
 Egy masodperc tortenete by Ágoston Kollányi
 Gloria dei Medici by Antonio Petrucci
 Goya, una vida apasionada by José María Ochoa
  by France Kosmac
 Horyû-Ji by Susumu Hani
 La Joconde: Histoire d'une obsession by Henri Gruel
 La Seine a rencontré Paris by Joris Ivens
 Les mystères d'une goutte d'eau by Ann H. Matzner Dr.
 Log Drive by Raymond Garceau
 Mandu by Neil Gokhale
 Nagrodzone uczucia by Walerian Borowczyk & Jan Lenica
 Nez nam narostla kridla by Jiří Brdečka
 Ô saisons ô châteaux by Agnès Varda
 Perameren hylkeenpyytajat by Ulf Backstrom
 Sapte Arte by Ion Popescu-Gopo
 Sintra by João Mendes
 The Story of a Roof by Jamie Uys
 Trees And Jamaica Daddy by Lew Keller
 Voici le pays d'Israel by Jean Lehérissey
 Y gorakh salianskykh by Leonid Belokurov, Y. Przyjemski
 Zimniy prazdnik by Mikhail Slutsky

Awards

Official awards
The following films and people received the 1958 awards:
Palme d'Or: The Cranes are Flying (Letyat zhuravli) by Mikhail Kalatozov
Best Director: Ingmar Bergman for Brink of Life (Nära livet)
Best Screenplay: Massimo Franciosa, Pasquale Festa Campanile and Pier Paolo Pasolini for Young Husbands (Giovani mariti)
Best Actress: Bibi Andersson, Eva Dahlbeck, Barbro Hiort af Ornäs and Ingrid Thulin for Brink of Life (Nära livet)
Best Actor: Paul Newman for The Long, Hot Summer
Special Mention:Tatiana Samoylova for Letyat zhuravli
Jury Prize:
Goha by Jacques Baratier
Visages de bronze by Bernard Taisant
Jury Special Prize: Mon Oncle by Jacques Tati
Short films
Short Film Palme d'Or: 
La Joconde: Histoire d'une obsession by Henri Gruel and Jean Suyeux
La Seine a rencontré Paris by Joris Ivens
Special Prize: Auf den Spuren des Lebens by Fritz Heydenreich & Nez nam narostla kridla by Jiri Brnecka

Independent awards
FIPRESCI Prize
Vengeance (La Venganza) by Juan Antonio Bardem

References

Media

British Pathé: Cannes Film Festival 1958 footage
British Pathé: Originals Cannes Film Festival 1958
British Pathé: Originals Cannes Film Festival 1958
INA: Opening of the 1958 festival (commentary in French)
INA: Celebrities at the 1958 Cannes festival (commentary in French)
INA: Closure of the 1958 festival (commentary in French)

External links 
1958 Cannes Film Festival (web.archive)
Official website Retrospective 1958 
Cannes Film Festival Awards for 1958 at Internet Movie Database

Cannes Film Festival, 1958
Cannes Film Festival, 1958
Cannes Film Festival